Ramgarh Gas Thermal Power Station commonly abbreviated as RGTPP is a gas-based thermal power plant located at Ramgarh in Jaisalmer district, Rajasthan. This power station is Rajasthan's(RAJSTHAN'S  FIRST GAS THERMAL POWER PLANT IS ANTA BARA NTPC GAS POWER PLANT WHICH COMMISSION IN JANUARY 1989 FIRST UNIT WHILE RAMGARGH PLANT'S FIRST UNIT COMMISSION ON JAN 1996), first gas based power station. The power plant is operated by the Rajasthan Rajya Vidyut Utpadan Nigam, a PSU company run by Govt. of Rajasthan. Power station houses the GAIL terminal for the supply of gas fuel. ONGC, OIL and Focus Energy Ltd. are among the gas suppliers. It has a staff of more than 200 engineers and technical workers.

Capacity
It has an installed capacity of 270.5 MW.

Awards
Ramgarh Gas thermal power station was awarded The Best Generating power station of Rajasthan for the year 2014. The award was given on 26 January 2015 on the occasion of Republic Day in Jaipur.

References
 http://www.rvunl.com/Ramgarh.html
 http://www.thehindu.com/todays-paper/tp-national/ramgarh-thermal-plant-capacity-being-expanded/article3260039.ece

Natural gas-fired power stations in Rajasthan
Jaisalmer district
1994 establishments in Rajasthan
Energy infrastructure completed in 1994